Tysagachchcy (Tıhağaççı) is a rural locality (a selo), one of three settlements, in addition to Keptin and Tongulakh, in Maltaninsky Rural Okrug of Gorny District in the Sakha Republic, Russia. Its population as of the 2002 Census was 2.

References

Notes

Sources
Official website of the Sakha Republic. Registry of the Administrative-Territorial Divisions of the Sakha Republic. Gorny District. 

Rural localities in Gorny District